Robby Gonzales is an American boxer. He competed at the 2021 AIBA World Boxing Championships, winning the gold medal in the light heavyweight event.

References

External links 

Living people
Place of birth missing (living people)
Year of birth missing (living people)
American male boxers
Light-heavyweight boxers
AIBA World Boxing Championships medalists